Beneath the 12-Mile Reef is a 1953 American Technicolor adventure film directed by Robert D. Webb and starring Robert Wagner, Terry Moore and Gilbert Roland. The screenplay was by A.I. Bezzerides. The film was the third motion picture made in CinemaScope, coming after The Robe  and How to Marry a Millionaire. The supporting cast features J. Carrol Naish, Richard Boone, Peter Graves, Jay Novello, Harry Carey Jr. and Jacques Aubuchon.

Plot
Mike (Gilbert Roland) and Tony Petrakis (Robert Wagner) are Greek American father and son sponge-diving entrepreneurs who find themselves in competition with the Rhys family, Conch fishermen who are prepared to resort to violence and murder to maintain their established fishing grounds off the Gulf Coast of Florida. Run-ins between the two clans lead to an exchange of threats and all-out brawls. Further complications ensue when Tony Petrakis meets Gwyneth Rhys (Terry Moore), and the two fall in love.

Cast
 Robert Wagner as Tony Petrakis
 Terry Moore as Gwyneth Rhys
 Gilbert Roland as Mike Petrakis
 J. Carrol Naish as Socrates Houlis
 Richard Boone as Thomas Rhys
 Angela Clarke as Mama Petrakis
 Peter Graves as Arnold Dix
 Jay Novello as Sinan
 Jacques Aubuchon as Demetrios Sofotes
 Gloria Gordon as Penny Petrakis
 Harry Carey Jr. as Griff Rhys
 Rev. Theophilus Karaphillis as Greek Priest at Epiphany

Production
The film originally was called Twelve Mile Reef and was announced in September 1952, with the leads to be played by Robert Wagner and Kathleen Crowley. By December, the female lead was going to be Debra Paget.

In February 1953, Fox announced the film would be shot in CinemaScope. That month, the first CinemaScope movie, The Robe, began filming. Beneath the 12 Mile Reef was the third film shot in that process, after How to Marry a Millionaire, and the first shot underwater.

Also that month, Terry Moore was given the female lead.

Filming started 6 April 1953. The film was shot on location in Key West and Tarpon Springs, Florida.

There were rumors during filming that Moore and Wagner had a romance. In reality, Wagner secretly was seeing Barbara Stanwyck, and Moore was seeing Howard Hughes.

Wagner almost drowned during filming at Tarpon Springs when he was accidentally kicked in the stomach by another actor. He sank to the bottom of the water and had to be rescued by a crew member.

Gloria Gordon, who had a small role, was signed to a seven-year contract.

Critical reception
Bosley Crowther of The New York Times observed "Another and further extension of the range of CinemaScope ... is handsomely manifested in Beneath the 12-Mile Reef ... But that, when you come right down to it, is just about the only novelty provided by this third employment of the anamorphic lens. For the scenes shot above the surface, while large and imposing, are routine, and the drama developed in the screen play is hackneyed and banal. And, unfortunately, most of the picture takes place above, not below, the reef ... There is nothing at all fascinating or edifying here."

Variety wrote "[T]he squeeze-lensing gives punch in the display of underwater wonders, the seascapes and the brilliant, beautiful sunrises and sunsets of the Florida Gulf coast. In handling the young cast, Robert D. Webb's direction is less effective, particularly in the case of Robert Wagner and Terry Moore. Both are likable, so the shallowness of their performances is no serious handicap to the entertainment."

Awards and nominations
Edward Cronjager was nominated for the Academy Award for Best Cinematography, and Robert D. Webb was nominated for the Grand Prize at the 1954 Cannes Film Festival.

See also

References

External links
 
 
 
 
 
 

1953 films
1953 romantic drama films
1950s adventure drama films
American adventure drama films
American romantic drama films
CinemaScope films
Films based on Romeo and Juliet
Modern adaptations of works by William Shakespeare
Seafaring films
Sponge diving
Films featuring underwater diving
Films set in Florida
Films shot in Florida
20th Century Fox films
Films directed by Robert D. Webb
Films scored by Bernard Herrmann
1950s English-language films
1950s American films